The Palazzo della Cancelleria (Palace of the Chancellery, referring to the former Apostolic Chancery of the Pope) is a Renaissance palace in Rome, Italy, situated between the present Corso Vittorio Emanuele II and the Campo de' Fiori, in the rione of Parione. It was built 1489–1513 by Baccio Pontelli and Antonio da Sangallo the Elder<ref>FROMMEL, Christop. Architettura del Rinascimento Italiano. Milano, Skyra, 2009, p. 150-154''</ref> as a palace for Cardinal Raffaele Riario, Camerlengo of the Holy Roman Church, and is regarded as the earliest Renaissance palace in Rome. The Palazzo houses the Papal Chancellery, is an extraterritorial property of the Holy See, and is designated as a World Heritage Site.

History
The Cancelleria was built for Cardinal Raffaele Riario who held the post of Cardinal Camerlengo to his powerful uncle, Pope Sixtus IV. The rumor was that the funds came from a single night's winnings at gaming.

In 1517, the newly completed Palazzo was seized by Pope Leo X, who suspected Cardinal Riario of plotting to assassinate him. He gifted the palace to his cousin, Cardinal Giulio de Medici (the future Pope Clement VII). Since Cardinal Giulio was the Vice-Chancellor of the Church, the palace became known as the Palazzo della Cancelleria thereafter. 

From 1753 the vice chancellor was the Jacobite pretender to the thrones of England, Scotland, France, and Ireland, Henry Stuart, Cardinal Duke of York, the Jacobite Henry IX of England and Ireland, and I of Scotland. During the late 17th century Christina, former Queen of Sweden, resided here.

During the Roman Republic of 1849 the parliament briefly sat here.

In 2015, it was the residence of retired, and now deceased, Cardinal Bernard Law of Boston, United States.

Architecture

The Palazzo della Cancelleria was the first palazzo in Rome to be erected from the ground up in the new Renaissance style. Its long facade engulfs the small Basilica di San Lorenzo in Damaso, the Cardinal's titular church, that is to its right, with the palatial front continuing straight across it. The entrance to the Basilica is on the right side of the facade. The 5th-century basilica (its interior has been rebuilt) sits, like the Basilica di San Clemente among others, on a pagan Roman mithraeum. Excavations beneath the cortile'' from 1988 to 1991 revealed the 4th- and 5th-century foundations of the grand Basilica di San Lorenzo in Damaso, founded by Pope Damasus I, and one of the most important early churches of Rome. A cemetery in use from the 8th century until shortly before the construction of the Palazzo was also identified.

The facade, with its rhythm of flat doubled pilasters between the arch-headed windows, is Florentine in conception, comparable to Leone Battista Alberti's Palazzo Rucellai. The overall pattern of drafted masonry, cut with smooth surfaces and grooves around the edges, is ancient Roman in origin. The grand portal was added in the 16th century by Domenico Fontana on the orders of Cardinal Alessandro Farnese.

The bone-colored travertine of the Palazzo was spolia from the nearby ancient ruins of the Theatre of Pompey, for Rome was a field of ruins, built for a city of over one million that then housed a mere 30,000. The 44 Egyptian granite columns of the inner courtyard are from the porticoes of the theatre's upper covered seating, however they were originally taken from the theatre to build the old Basilica di San Lorenzo in Damaso. It is more probable that the form of the courtyard is derived from that of the Palazzo Ducale in Urbino, because the individuals involved in the early planning of the Palazzo had come from Urbino. 

In the Palazzo is a vast mural that Giorgio Vasari completed in a mere 100 days, therefore named the Sala dei Cento Giorni. He boasted of this accomplishment to Michelangelo, who responded "Si vede" ("It shows"). In the Palazzo a little, private theatre was installed by Cardinal Pietro Ottoboni, and in the later 17th century the Palazzo became a center of musical performance in Rome.

At the time when Cardinal Pietro Ottoboni lived there as vice-chancellor, the Palazzo della Cancelleria became an important center of the musical life of Rome. Between 1694 and 1705 several oratories by Alessandro Scarlatti and various cantatas for Christmas were performed here for the first time. In 1709 Ottoboni also had a theater built on a project by the architect Filippo Juvarra, which was removed after his death (February 28, 1740). It was in this theater that at least one gathering of the Accademia degli Arcadi was held on the occasion of Christmas 1712 to celebrate the child Jesus.

See also
 Cancelleria Reliefs

References

External links
Palazzo della Cancelleria Apostolica
The Vatican: spirit and art of Christian Rome, a book from The Metropolitan Museum of Art Libraries (fully available online as PDF), which contains material on the Palazzo (p. 370-4)

Houses completed in 1513
Cancelleria
Extraterritorial properties of the Holy See in Rome
Renaissance architecture in Rome
Cancelleria
Filippo Juvarra buildings